Sandgren is a surname. Notable people with the surname include:

 Åke Sandgren (born 1955), Swedish-Danish film director and screenwriter
 August Sandgren (1893 – 1934), Danish bookbinder
 Gunnar Sandgren (1929–2016), Swedish novelist and playwright
 Gustav Sandgren (born 1904–1983), Swedish author
 Jacob Sandgren (born 1973), Swedish politician
 Tennys Sandgren (born 1991), American professional tennis player

Swedish-language surnames